Castleshane is a racehorse who has been trained in Lincolnshire by Steve Gollings since moving to Britain from Ireland in 2000. In total the horse has won 8 flat races and 2 jumps races and has been placed 23 times. He is primarily a hurdler, only having several runs over fences.

See also
 List of historical horses

References
 Castleshane's pedigree and racing stats

1997 racehorse births
Racehorses bred in Ireland
Racehorses trained in the United Kingdom